Bee Branch is a stream in the Laclede County in the  Ozarks of southern Missouri. It is a tributary of North Cobb Creek.

Bee Branch was so named on account of honeybees in the area.

See also
List of rivers of Missouri

References

Rivers of Laclede County, Missouri
Rivers of Missouri